Ambesa is a genus of snout moths. It was described by Augustus Radcliffe Grote in 1880.

Species
Ambesa dentifera Neunzig, 2003
Ambesa laetella Grote, 1880
Ambesa walsinghami (Ragonot, 1887)
Ambesa lallatalis (Hulst, 1886)

References

Phycitinae
Moth genera